The New Adventures of Spin and Marty: Suspect Behavior is a 2000 television film, starring David Gallagher and Jeremy Foley. It was written by David Simkins and directed by Rusty Cundieff. The film is part of Disney's anthology The Wonderful World of Disney, that included several movies and animations produced and released by the studio from 1995 to 2005. It was based on the novel "The Undertaker's Gone Bananas" by Paul Zindel and is an updated version of the eponymous characters from the 1950s popular series Spin and Marty. The New Adventures of Spin and Marty was aired by ABC on August 13, 2000.

Plot
Marty, a rich boy helps his friend Spin to investigate his suspicious neighbors.

Cast
 David Gallagher as Marty Markham
 Jeremy Foley as Spin Evans
 Charles Shaughnessy as Jordan Welsh
 Yancy Butler as Veronica Hulka 
 Judd Nelson as Jack Hulka

References

External links
 
 

2000s English-language films